The Amelia S. Givin Free Library is a historic public library in Mount Holly Springs, Cumberland County, Pennsylvania. It was added to the National Register of Historic Places on August 11, 2004.

History 
The library was built in 1889 and was dedicated on January 2, 1890. The library was listed on the National Register of Historic Places on August 11, 2004.

Architecture 
It was designed by Richardsonian Romanesque student James T. Steen and is faced with Hummelstown brownstone.  Design elements include intricate carvings, semicircular arched windows, crescent apse and moorish fretwork.  The Amelia S. Givin Free Library "contains the most extensive and most elaborate installation of moorish fretwork still in existence today".

See also 
 National Register of Historic Places listings in Cumberland County, Pennsylvania

References

External links 
 Amelia S. Givin Free Library

Library buildings completed in 1889
Libraries on the National Register of Historic Places in Pennsylvania
Libraries in Pennsylvania
Romanesque Revival architecture in Pennsylvania
Buildings and structures in Cumberland County, Pennsylvania
1890 establishments in Pennsylvania
National Register of Historic Places in Cumberland County, Pennsylvania